Armor Reece Pyrtle Jr. is a Republican member of the North Carolina House of Representatives who has represented the 65th district (including parts of Rockingham County) since 2021. He was appointed in August 2021 to the fill the vacancy left by Jerry Carter, who died in office. A retired police chief from Eden, North Carolina, Pyrtle previously served on the Rockingham County board of commissioners from 2016 to 2021.

Electoral history

2022

2020

2016

Committee assignments

2021-2022 session

Appropriations 
Appropriations - Justice & Public Safety
Families, Children, and Aging Policy
Health
Homeland Security, Military, and Veterans Affairs
Judiciary 2
Local Government - Land Use, Planning & Development

References

Living people
Year of birth missing (living people)
People from Eden, North Carolina
People from Rockingham County, North Carolina
21st-century American politicians
County commissioners in North Carolina
Republican Party members of the North Carolina House of Representatives